Jordan Rideout (born 26 February 1993) is an English footballer. He is the son of former Everton legend Paul Rideout who scored the winning goal in the 1995 FA Cup Final vs. Manchester United.

Jordan Rideout's professional career was cut short after suffering an ankle ligament tear in February 2017 while with Saint Louis FC (USL Championship). Rideout played 6 games for Saint Louis FC including the inaugural match that opened Exploria Stadium against Orlando City in a team with Kaka and Nocerino (MLS).

Career

College and amateur
Rideout spent time with Sporting Kansas City youth team for four years, before playing college soccer for four years at the University of Missouri-Kansas City.

While at college, Rideout appeared for USL PDL side Kansas City Brass in 2012 and 2013, and later Ventura County Fusion in 2014.

Professional
Rideout signed his first professional contract with United Soccer League club Arizona United on 19 May 2015. He signed with Oklahoma City Energy FC the following season.

Personal life
Rideout is the son of, Paul, who played professional football for the likes Swindon Town, Aston Villa, Bari, Southampton, Everton and Kansas City Wizards.

References

External links

1993 births
Living people
English footballers
English expatriate footballers
Kansas City Brass players
Ventura County Fusion players
Phoenix Rising FC players
Association football forwards
Expatriate soccer players in the United States
Kansas City Roos men's soccer players
USL League Two players
USL Championship players
English expatriate sportspeople in the United States